S. bakeri may refer to:
 Sericulus bakeri, the fire-maned bowerbird, a bowerbird
 Spartina bakeri, the sand cordgrass, a plant species in the genus Spartina

See also
 Bakeri (disambiguation)